Olga Sviderska (born 2 October 1989) is a Ukrainian Paralympic swimmer. She won two silver medals at the 2012 Summer Paralympics and one bronze medal at the 2016 Summer Paralympics. She won seven gold medals, including five individual golds, at the 2013 IPC Swimming World Championships in Montreal.

In 2014 she was nominated for the Laureus World Sports Award for Sportsperson of the Year with a Disability award.

References

External links 
 
 Olga Sviderska – Glasgow 2015 IPC Swimming World Championships at the International Paralympic Committee

1989 births
Living people
Ukrainian female freestyle swimmers
Paralympic swimmers of Ukraine
Paralympic silver medalists for Ukraine
Paralympic medalists in swimming
Swimmers at the 2012 Summer Paralympics
Swimmers at the 2016 Summer Paralympics
Medalists at the 2012 Summer Paralympics
Medalists at the 2016 Summer Paralympics
Medalists at the World Para Swimming Championships
Medalists at the World Para Swimming European Championships
Laureates of the Prize of the Cabinet of Ministers of Ukraine for special achievements of youth in the development of Ukraine
Ukrainian female medley swimmers
Ukrainian female breaststroke swimmers
Ukrainian female backstroke swimmers
S3-classified Paralympic swimmers